A.D. (1985) is an American/Italian miniseries in six parts which adapts the narrative in the Acts of the Apostles. Considered as the third and final installment in a TV miniseries trilogy which began with Moses the Lawgiver (1974) and Franco Zeffirelli's Jesus of Nazareth (1977), it was adapted from Anthony Burgess's 1985 novel The Kingdom of the Wicked, which was itself a sequel to Burgess's book Man of Nazareth, on which was based Zeffirelli's movie. The title is the abbreviation for Anno Domini (Medieval Latin, "In the year of the Lord"), as the events occur in the first years of the Christian Era.

Plot summary
The story tells the life histories about Saint Peter and Paul of Tarsus after the crucifixion of Jesus, and their individual fates in old Rome in the time of the persecution of Christians. Events in the New Testament Book of Acts by Luke and in the Ecclesiastical History of Eusebius are dramatized and interwoven with the contrasting histories of political intrigues in the public and private lives of the Caesars from Tiberius through Nero related in The Twelve Caesars by Suetonius, together with the fictional drama of the lives of two Jews and two Romans: Caleb the Zealot and his sister Sarah, and Julius Valerius the Imperial Guard and Corinna the patrician woman who has chosen to be a gladiator.

After Caleb is condemned to be crucified, his mother is murdered when Roman soldiers carry out Pilate's orders to have Caleb's sisters Sarah and Ruth sent to Sejanus in Rome as "gifts". Caleb is rescued on the way to execution, and goes to Rome to find them. He enlists as a gladiator, takes the name "Metellus", meets and falls in love with Corinna, and is trained as a retiarius. Meanwhile, Ruth, grieving, provokes a Roman soldier to kill her during the voyage to Rome, and Sarah is made a slave in Sejanus' household, until he is executed for treason, and she then becomes part of Caligula's household. Tiberius, after ordering the execution of Sejanus, was himself secretly assassinated by Caligula, who has now become Caesar. Julius Valerius, having met Sarah on Sejanus' estate, has fallen in love with her, and when she is put on the slave block to be sold as part of an imperial fund-raising effort he, with the financial help of his parents and additional funds provided by Aquilla and Priscilla, Jewish tent-makers, buys her for himself and frees her to become his wife. Caleb is informed that Sarah is alive, but he is scandalized that she has married a Roman soldier. He meets Valerius and is soon confronted with the fact that he himself loves a Roman woman, now disinherited and disowned by her father.

Valerius and Caleb participate in the plot to assassinate Caligula, and the stammering Claudius (found hiding) is hailed as the new Caesar. He expels the Jews from Rome, but Sarah is exempt as the wife of a Roman. Caleb/Metellus and Corinna also remain. Aquilla and Priscilla return to Jerusalem. Soon afterward Claudius is poisoned by Agrippina after having designated her son Nero as successor over his own son Britannicus, and she herself is then killed by order of Nero.

Caleb later marries Corinna near her parents' estate under the open sky with "only God as the witnessing Rabbi". The missionary Paul is arrested and Julius Valerius is tasked with escorting the prisoner to Rome; then 2 years later he is set free. Valerius and Sarah convert to Christ and soon become parents of a daughter they name Ruth.

The burning of Rome is used by Nero at the urging of Tigellinus as a pretext to deflect the blame from himself to the Christians. The dramatization of the persecution that follows includes the inverted crucifixion of Peter, the beheading of Paul, and the preparation of Christian children for the arena being dressed in fresh lambskins and led out to be torn to pieces by Roman war dogs. Caleb and Corinna armed with sword, shield, net and trident rush into the arena to fight the dogs to save the children, several of them being killed before the dogs are slain. The crowd is thrilled with the dramatic rescue. During public announcements of more entertainment to come, Valerius enters and grieves over the death of his daughter, only to find afterward that she is still alive and was never in the arena. In grief and rage over Rome's corruption and cruelty, he renounces his military career and his Roman citizenship, and he and Sarah leave Rome.

Linus, long-time family friend of Corinna's, having succeeded Peter, and knowing that Corinna cannot have a child of her own, entrusts a child orphaned by Nero's persecution to her and Caleb, charging them to raise the boy in the faith of his parents. They thank him and depart by ship for Jerusalem. They name him "Joshua".

Cast

 Anthony Andrews - Nero
 Colleen Dewhurst - Antonia Minor
 Ava Gardner - Agrippina the Younger
 David Hedison - Porcius Festus
 John Houseman - Gamaliel
 Richard Kiley - Claudius
 James Mason - Tiberius
 John McEnery - Caligula
 Ian McShane - Sejanus
 Jennifer O'Neill - Messalina
 Millie Perkins - Mary, mother of Jesus
 Denis Quilley - Saint Peter
 Fernando Rey - Seneca the Younger
 Richard Roundtree - Serpenius
 Susan Sarandon - Livilla
 Ben Vereen - The Ethiopian
 Tony Vogel - Aquila
 Jack Warden - Nerva
 Anthony Zerbe - Pontius Pilate
 Neil Dickson - Valerius
 Chris Humphreys (billed as Cecil Humphreys) - Caleb
 Amanda Pays - Sarah
 Philip Sayer - Paul of Tarsus
 Diane Venora - Corinna
 Michael Wilding Jr. - Jesus
 Vincent Riotta - Saint Stephen
 Rebecca Saire - Ruth
 Tom Durham - Cleophas
 Anthony Pedley - Zacchaeus
 Harold Kasket - Caiaphas
 Ralph Arliss - Samuel
 Mike Gwilym - Pallas
 Davyd Harries - Thomas
 Bruce Winant - Seth
 Jonathan Hyde - Tigellinus
 Damien Thomas - Agrippa I
 Derek Hoxby - Agrippa II
 Angela Morant - Priscilla
 Clive Arrindell - Cassius Chaerea
 Paul Freeman - Centurion Cornelius
 Andrea Prodan - Britannicus
 Akosua Busia - Claudia Acte
 Vernon Dobtcheff - Titus Flavius Sabinus
 Gerrard McArthur - Luke the Evangelist
 Jane How - Poppaea Sabina
 Jonathan Tafler - Aaron
 Richard Kane - Agrippa Postumus
 Barrie Houghton - Ananias
 Maggie Wickman - Apicata
 Alan Downer - Barnabas
 Martin Potter - Gaius Calpurnius Piso
 Colin Haigh - James the Just
 Renato Scarpa - Lucius Marinus
 Roderick Horn - Marcellus
 John Wheatley - Mark the Evangelist
 Joss Buckley - Matthew the Evangelist
 David Sumner - Saint Matthias
 Stephen Finlay - Nicanor
 Katia Thandoulaki - Claudia Octavia
 Eddie Grossman - Parmenas
 David Haughton - Petronius
 John Steiner - Simon Magus
 Robert Wentz - Thrasyllus
 Philip Anthony - James the Great
 Peter Blythe - Procuius
 Peter Howell - Atticus
 David Rintoul - Pope Linus
 Ned Vukovic - Triumvir
 W. Morgan Sheppard - Gracchus

Crew
 Teleplay by: Anthony Burgess and Vincenzo Labella
 Director of photography: Ennio Guarnieri, AIC
 Costumes by: Enrico Sabbatini

See also

 A.D. The Bible Continues
 Seven Deacons

Notes

External links
 

1985 Italian television series debuts
1985 Italian television series endings
1980s British drama television series
1980s Italian television miniseries
1980s British television miniseries
Television dramas set in ancient Rome
Acts of the Apostles
Television series based on the Bible
Television shows based on British novels
1985 British television series debuts
1985 British television series endings
Works based on the New Testament
1980s American television miniseries
Depictions of Nero on television
Cultural depictions of Agrippina the Younger
Cultural depictions of Claudius
Cultural depictions of Tiberius
Depictions of Caligula on television
Cultural depictions of Messalina
Cultural depictions of Mary, mother of Jesus
Cultural depictions of Seneca the Younger
Cultural depictions of Pontius Pilate
Portrayals of Jesus on television
Cultural depictions of Poppaea Sabina
Cultural depictions of Britannicus
Cultural depictions of Saint Peter
Cultural depictions of Claudia Octavia